Thomas Danks Sneddon was a Scottish amateur football right back who appeared in the Scottish League for Queen's Park.

References

1897 births
Scottish footballers
Scottish Football League players
Association football fullbacks
Queen's Park F.C. players
Place of death missing
Date of death missing
People from Dennistoun